The Sierra Perenchiza Formation is a late Campanian to late Maastrichtian geologic formation in Spain. Dinosaur, pterosaur, turtle, lissamphibian, frog and albanerpetontid remains are among the fossils that have been recovered from the formation, although none have yet been referred to a specific genus and the crocodylomorphs Acynodon, Doratodon ibericus and Musturzabalsuchus are also known from this formation.

See also 
 List of dinosaur-bearing rock formations
 List of stratigraphic units with indeterminate dinosaur fossils

References

Bibliography 
  

Geologic formations of Spain
Upper Cretaceous Series of Europe
Cretaceous Spain
Campanian Stage
Maastrichtian Stage
Limestone formations
Marl formations
Lacustrine deposits
Fossiliferous stratigraphic units of Europe
Paleontology in Spain